The 2017 Marine Harvest National Division was the 4th season of the National Division since its reinstatement in 2014. The National Division is the 2nd tier in Shinty. The season begun on 4 March 2017 consisting of 8 teams from across Scotland. 

The 2017 Cup competitions competed were the Camanachd Cup, Macaulay Cup, MacTavish Cup (North District teams only) and the Glasgow Celtic Society Cup (South District teams only).

Any team winning all 4 major trophies for which they are eligible to take part in will achieve the coveted Shinty Grand Slam.

The 2017 Marine Harvest National Division champions were Skye Camanachd who were promoted to the Marine Harvest Premiership along with Caberfeidh Camanachd Club who finished runner up.

Teams

League summary

League table
Updated 28 July 2018

Form 
Updated 28 July 2018

Top Scorer(s) 
Top Scorer or Scorers onlyUpdated 28 July 2018

References

Shinty
2017 in Scottish sport